Nisli (also, Nesli) is a village and municipality in the Lerik Rayon of Azerbaijan.  It has a population of 291.  The municipality consists of the villages of Nisli and Xozavi.

References 

Populated places in Lerik District